Business Bay is a rapid transit station on the Red Line of the Dubai Metro in Dubai, UAE. It opened on 15 October 2010 along with four other intermediate stations on the Red Line.

Location
Business Bay station is located at the intersection of Sheikh Zayed Road and 35th Street, southwest of Dubai's historic centre. As its name suggests, the station serves the large Business Bay, which borders Downtown Dubai. To the west of the station is the neighborhood of Al Wasl. The distance between Business Bay and Al Safa station (formerly known as Noor Bank Metro Station) stations is among the longest in the system; as a result, station codes 27 and 28 have been reserved for future use.

Station layout
Like many stations on the Red Line, Business Bay lies on a viaduct paralleling the eastern side of Sheikh Zayed Road. It is categorized as a type 1 elevated station, indicating that the station's concourse is at ground level. Pedestrian access is aided by a skybridge across Sheikh Zayed Road to Al Wasl. A crossover to the west of the station allows reversals from both Rashidiya and Jumeirah Lakes Towers.

Platform layout

References

Railway stations in the United Arab Emirates opened in 2010
Dubai Metro stations